Vivian Alexander Anderson, MBE (born 29 July 1956) is an English former professional footballer and coach. He won five senior trophies including the 1977–78 Football League title, and both the 1978–79 European Cup and the 1979–80 European Cup playing for Brian Clough's Nottingham Forest. He was later part of the squads to win a domestic cup with each of Arsenal and Manchester United. He also played for Sheffield Wednesday, Barnsley and Middlesbrough. He was the first black and second non-white footballer after Paul Reaney to play for the senior men's England national football team.

Early life and playing career

Nottingham Forest
Anderson was born in Clifton, Nottingham. His parents, Audley and Myrtle were both from Jamaica. Audley came to England in 1954, while Myrtle arrived in 1955. Despite the racial tensions at the time, Anderson has said his childhood was relatively untroubled by discrimination and his parents must take a lot of credit for protecting him from the worst excesses of the environment they lived in. He spent a year as a schoolboy with Manchester United before being released. He returned to Nottingham where at school he sat and passed three CSEs. He then worked for three weeks as a silkscreen printer that he described as "a glorified tea boy really. I'd get the tea, and get the sandwiches at lunch time. I was just a dogsbody." Anderson had broken into the Nottingham Forest team during 1974 and became a regular after the arrival of Brian Clough as manager of the East Midlands club, then in the Second Division, in January 1975. He was part of the side that won promotion to the First Division in 1977, winning the title, along with the League Cup, a year later.

Anderson was one of the first black players to represent top English clubs at the time, and regularly suffered racial abuse from fans of rival teams. He was regularly pelted with bananas and targeted with racist chants.

Anderson made his debut for England in November 1978, for a friendly against Czechoslovakia. He became the second non-white footballer to represent the men's senior England team after Paul Reaney who had first appeared for England in 1968. Coach Ron Greenwood was insistent that no political issue was at stake, despite the ever-rising number of young black stars in the game, born and raised in England. There was no doubt that Anderson was playing outstandingly in a form team that season and got his call-up entirely on merit. A gangly, awkward figure, he was a much-admired tackler and was also quick going forward and occasionally scored vital goals. Vindication for his selection on merit was further supplied when Anderson was part of the Forest team that retained the League Cup (though he missed the final through injury) and then clinched the European Cup in 1979 with victory over Malmö.

His second cap was in a friendly against Sweden in June 1979. His third appearance was his first competitive international as England defeated Bulgaria 2–0 at Wembley in a qualifier for the 1980 European Championships.

Anderson continued to impress for Forest during this period, and picked up his second European Cup winners' medal when they retained the trophy with victory over Hamburger SV in Madrid. Forest did reach a third successive League Cup final that year, but lost to Wolverhampton Wanderers.

England had duly got through to the European Championship finals in Italy and Anderson was named in Greenwood's squad, playing in the final group game against Spain as a replacement for Phil Neal. England won 2–1 but did not progress further. Anderson later made his World Cup debut in a qualifier for the 1982 competition in a 4–0 win over Norway. Essentially the battle was now between Neal and Anderson for the No. 2 shirt, but after qualification for the World Cup, suddenly neither were appropriate for the role.

Injury to Kevin Keegan had meant Greenwood needed to call upon an experienced club captain to lead the team out in Spain, so Ipswich Town's skipper Mick Mills, normally a left-back, was put in the right-back slot (with regular incumbent Kenny Sansom remaining on the left) and both Neal and Anderson missed out. Neal played against Kuwait in the final group game to rest Mills when qualification had already been assured, but Mills returned for the second phase, from which England were eliminated. Anderson, meanwhile, never kicked a ball.

With Forest beginning to fall from grace (the ageing side was breaking up and the 1980 European Cup win was to prove to be their last trophy for nine years), Anderson's England career seemed to be stalling. After the World Cup and Greenwood's departure, he did not feature at all under new coach Bobby Robson until 1984, with Neal still mainly getting the nod. England failed to qualify for the 1984 European Championships during this period. Anderson finally won an 11th cap, in April 1984, almost two years after his tenth.

Arsenal
In the summer of 1984, he aimed to revive his career with a move to Arsenal for £250,000. This duly helped Anderson revitalise his international standing and he won six consecutive caps from 1984 and into 1985, including four qualifiers for the 1986 World Cup in Mexico; in the first of which he scored his first of his two international goals in an 8–0 mauling of Turkey. Then Robson gave a debut to the young Everton right-back Gary Stevens who was so impressive that Anderson found himself usurped again. Robson split his selection policy, but Stevens got slightly more appearances than Anderson as England completed their qualification for Mexico and though both were in the squad for the finals, it was clear that Anderson was again going as reserve. Anderson won three caps at the end of 1986 as England began their quest to qualify for the 1988 European Championships in Germany. In one of the qualifiers against Yugoslavia, Anderson scored his second and final international goal. 

His time at Arsenal saw the club develop from underachieving in the First Division, to enjoying a victory over Liverpool in the 1987 League Cup Final, and he finally enjoyed some club success for the first time in seven years since the European Cup. He also scored a vital goal against Arsenals rivals Tottenham in the second leg of the semi final. He scored 15 goals in his three seasons at Highbury, a spell that saw him make 150 appearances for the club. Much of Arsenal’s upturn in fortunes at this time can be attributed to George Graham’s arrival in May 1986. The side was built upon a strong defence whose training involved being connected with rope to ensure they learned to work together. At this time, Anderson provided much inspiration to the young Tony Adams. The 30-year-old Anderson was rewarded with a three-year contract offer from Arsenal at the end of the 1987 season. Arsenal expected Anderson to agree to the new deal but he instead signed with Manchester United, the same club who had released him as a teenager.

Manchester United
After a tribunal agreed £250,000 fee, he became Alex Ferguson's first signing since taking over as manager of Manchester United.

Meanwhile, Stevens had forced his way back in as England qualified for the European Championships and Anderson won his 30th and (what proved to be) final cap in a Rous Cup game against Colombia though was again in reserve when the squad went to Germany for the finals. They lost all three group games and Stevens came in for criticism, but maintained his place. For the third time, Anderson had travelled to a major international competition without getting a minute on the pitch. Robson began to look to the younger end of the playing spectrum for competition for Stevens, and Anderson's international career ended.

At Old Trafford Anderson was a significant part of Alex Ferguson's rebuilding plans as he attempted to create a title winning side to end the wait that had started at the club in 1967. Following a dismal start to the 1986–87 season that had cost Ron Atkinson his job on 5 November, Ferguson had steered United from 21st to 11th of 22 First Division clubs in the final six months of the campaign. Anderson played his part in United's continued improvement in 1987–88, as they finished second in the league but never really looked like overhauling Liverpool, who finished champions by a nine-point margin with just two defeats all season as well as a 29-match unbeaten start to the 40-game campaign.

Anderson remained first-choice right-back in 1988–89, but United had a slow start to the season and despite an upturn in their form in the new year that saw them climb to third place by mid-February, a dismal final quarter of the season dragged them down to 11th place. Despite finishing 13th in the league in 1989–90, United won the FA Cup – but Anderson was not in the squad for the final. He had managed 21 games in all competitions that season but Alex Ferguson had chosen Paul Ince – normally a central midfielder – as his right-back for the first match (a 3–3 draw with Crystal Palace) and also the replay five days later, which ended in a 1–0 win.

Anderson's hopes of winning his place back in the 1990–91 season were crushed when Ferguson paid Oldham Athletic £625,000 for Denis Irwin, who quickly established himself as the first choice right-back, while Ince switched back to central midfield. He played just three more games for the club, and on his final appearance for them in the Football League Cup second round second leg against Halifax Town on 10 October 1990 he scored their first goal in a 2–1 win that gave a 5–2 aggregate victory.

Sheffield Wednesday
Anderson joined Sheffield Wednesday on a free transfer in January 1991, helping them to promotion from the Second Division, although he missed the League Cup final triumph over Manchester United as he had played for his old club earlier in the competition. Despite originally being thought of as a short-term signing, Anderson established himself in the Wednesday first team and captained the side on many occasions. He played an active part in the Owls team that finished third in the 1991–92 First Division and seventh in the first season of the Premier League. He also helped Wednesday reach the FA Cup and League Cup final in 1993, but they were on the losing side to Arsenal in both finals.

Barnsley
Anderson's manner on the pitch made him an obvious choice for management and in June 1993 he left Hillsborough to be appointed player-manager of Barnsley following the departure of Mel Machin. However, his first season at Oakwell was a disappointment as Barnsley narrowly avoided relegation to Division Two.

Middlesbrough
At the end of 1993–94, Anderson quit Barnsley after just a year to become assistant manager of Middlesbrough under former Old Trafford teammate Bryan Robson.

Despite retiring from playing football in 1994, Anderson was still officially registered as a player and following an injury crisis at Middlesbrough he played two games for the club in 1994–95 when they were promoted to the Premier League as Division One champions. After gaining promotion he finally hung up his playing boots.

Anderson helped Robson assemble a side that reached both domestic cup finals (both of which they lost) in 1996–97, although they were relegated due to a three-point deduction for postponing a December fixture at late notice as a result of so many players being unable to play due to illness or injury. However, Boro won promotion at the first attempt and were League Cup runners-up once again. Robson and Anderson finally left Middlesbrough in June 2001 when Terry Venables was brought in with the club facing relegation. Despite never achieving anything higher than ninth place in the final table the duo had managed to establish Boro in the Premier League.

After football career
Anderson has not been employed in football since leaving the assistant manager's job at Middlesbrough.

In 1997, Anderson was given the right-back slot by Forest fans voting for the club's all-time greatest XI, gaining 96% of the vote.

He was awarded an MBE in January 2000.

Anderson was inducted into the English Football Hall of Fame in 2004 in recognition of his impact on the English league. He remains a keen supporter of the National Football Museum and regularly attends special events at the museum.

As of 2005, Anderson ran a sports travel agency and also works as a goodwill ambassador for the Football Association. Anderson appears as an occasional guest pundit on MUTV; Manchester United's official TV station.

The People's History Museum in Manchester has one of Viv Anderson's shirts on display in the Main Galleries. The shirt was worn on his debut match against Czechoslovakia in 1978.

Career statistics

International goals
Scores and results list England's goal tally first, score column indicates score after each Anderson goal.

Honours
Nottingham Forest
First Division: 1977–78
League Cup: 1977–78, 1978–79
European Cup: 1978–79, 1979–80
FA Charity Shield: 1978
European Super Cup: 1979
Anglo Scottish Cup: 1976–77

Arsenal
League Cup: 1986–87

Manchester United
FA Charity Shield: 1990

References

External links

Viv Anderson photos, biography and statistics at sporting-heroes.net
100 Great Black Britons profile
Profile
England's black players
English Football Hall of Fame Profile

1956 births
Arsenal F.C. players
Barnsley F.C. managers
England B international footballers
English Football Hall of Fame inductees
English football managers
English footballers
England international footballers
England under-21 international footballers
1982 FIFA World Cup players
1986 FIFA World Cup players
Living people
Manchester United F.C. players
Members of the Order of the British Empire
People from Clifton, Nottinghamshire
Footballers from Nottinghamshire
Nottingham Forest F.C. players
Sheffield Wednesday F.C. players
Middlesbrough F.C. players
UEFA Euro 1980 players
UEFA Euro 1988 players
Premier League players
English Football League players
Black British sportsmen
Race-related controversies in the United Kingdom
Barnsley F.C. players
Middlesbrough F.C. non-playing staff
English sportspeople of Jamaican descent
Association football defenders
UEFA Champions League winning players
FA Cup Final players
Footballers from Nottingham